Dolphinton (North British Railway) railway station served the village of Dolphinton, Lanarkshire, Scotland from 1864 to 1933 on the Leadburn, Linton and Dolphinton Railway. There was another separate station in Dolphinton served by  trains of the Caledonian Railway from 1867 to 1945.

History 
The station opened on 4 July 1864 by the North British Railway. There was a stone built locomotive shed nearby. The station closed to both passengers and goods traffic on 1 April 1933.

References

External links 

Former North British Railway stations
Railway stations in Great Britain opened in 1864
Railway stations in Great Britain closed in 1933
1864 establishments in England
1933 disestablishments in Scotland